William Farrell  was a 19th-century Major League Baseball player. He played for the 1882 Philadelphia Athletics  and 1883 Baltimore Orioles in the  American Association.

External links

19th-century baseball players
Major League Baseball catchers
Major League Baseball shortstops
Major League Baseball outfielders
Baseball players from Connecticut
Philadelphia Athletics (AA) players
Baltimore Orioles (AA) players
San Francisco Bay City players
Sportspeople from Bridgeport, Connecticut